Barnwell is an unincorporated community in Baldwin County, Alabama, United States. It is located along US 98 in the southern part of the county. Some municipal services are provided by Fairhope. Barnwell is designated by the USGS as a populated place that is neither incorporated nor a census-designated place.

History
Barnwell is named for a local family. A post office operated under the name Barnwell from 1903 to 1942.

References

Unincorporated communities in Alabama
Unincorporated communities in Baldwin County, Alabama